CSAM may refer to: 

 Cold spray additive manufacturing
 Child sexual abuse material, an alternative name for child pornography
 California Society of Addiction Medicine
 Collections & Stories of American Muslims
 Credit Suisse Asset Management
Montclair State University College of Science and Mathematics
 James Madison University College of Science and Mathematics
 Code scanning and analysis manager, used by VirtualBox
 Cultural stereotype accuracy-meaning model
 Le Comité sida aide Montréal, a Quebec working group formed in 1983 working on HIV/AIDS in Canada
 Confocal scanning acoustic microscope, a type of an acoustic microscope
 C-mode scanning acoustic microscope, a type of an acoustic microscope